Christian Dalmau (born August 29, 1975) is a Puerto Rican retired professional basketball player. He is the second son of the legendary Puerto Rican basketball star Raymond Dalmau. Dalmau has played in the NCAA, the National Basketball Development League, and the Baloncesto Superior Nacional in Puerto Rico. Dalmau has played internationally in Turkey, Poland, and Israel. Dalmau was a member of the Puerto Rican National Basketball Team that defeated the United States in the 2004 Olympic Games.

Biography
After playing college basketball in the NCAA, Dalmau began his professional career in 1993 with the Piratas de Quebradillas in Puerto Rico's top level Baloncesto Superior Nacional (BSN). As a rookie, he showed great potential but the team decided to trade him for more experienced players. His new team was the Maratonistas de Coamo where he would become a star. Dalmau joined the BSN's new Avancinos de Villalba in 1996, playing there from 1996–1998. When Villalba folded after its third season, Dalmau returned to Coama for two seasons, then was traded to the Atleticos de San German in 2001.

In the 2002-2003 season, Dalmau signed with the Mobile Revelers of the National Basketball Development League. Dalmau was named Most Valuable Player in 2004. That same year he was selected to replace his brother, Richie, on the Puerto Rican National Basketball Team. He played in the Israeli Basketball League with Hapoel Galil Elyon. From 2005-07, Dalmau played in Poland with Prokom Trefl Sopot.

For the 2007-08 season, Dalmau played with Beşiktaş Cola Turka of the Turkish League. In July 2008 he signed a contract with PBC Ural Great Perm in Russian Basketball Super League 1.

In 2009, Dalmau returned to the BSN to play for the Vaqueros de Bayamón. He led the team to victory at the 2009 BSN Championship, and was chosen as the 2009 BSN Finals MVP.  In 2010, after being named the league's MVP during the regular season, Dalmau led Bayamón to their second straight BSN Finals appearance, losing at home in game seven to the Capitanes de Arecibo.

After the 2012 BSN season with Bayamón, now in his late 30s, Dalmau moved to a number of teams, in different leagues, over the next five seasons. In the BSN, he played with the Mets de Guaynabo, Cangrejeros de Santurce and returned to his rookie team, the Piratas de Quebradillas. He also played with Halcones Xalapa in Mexico's Liga Nacional de Baloncesto Profesional.

Dalmau returned to Bayamón in 2017, retiring from playing basketball at the end of that season.

In 2018, Dalmau became head coach of the senior boys basketball team at Central Pointe Christian Academy, a small prep high school in Kissimmee, Florida. In March 2020, the team won the Sunshine Independent Athletic Association championship.

See also
List of Puerto Ricans

Sources

References

1975 births
Living people
2002 FIBA World Championship players
2006 FIBA World Championship players
Asseco Gdynia players
Atléticos de San Germán players
Baloncesto Superior Nacional players
Basketball players at the 2004 Summer Olympics
Beşiktaş men's basketball players
Cangrejeros de Santurce basketball players
Capitanes de Arecibo players
Central American and Caribbean Games gold medalists for Puerto Rico
Competitors at the 2010 Central American and Caribbean Games
Puerto Rican expatriate basketball people in Poland
Halcones de Xalapa players
Hapoel Galil Elyon players
Israeli Basketball Premier League players
Maratonistas de Coamo players
Mobile Revelers players
Olympic basketball players of Puerto Rico
PBC Ural Great players
People from Arecibo, Puerto Rico
Piratas de Quebradillas players
Point guards
Puerto Rican expatriate basketball people in Turkey
Puerto Rican men's basketball players
Puerto Rico men's national basketball team players
Shooting guards
Trefl Sopot players
Central American and Caribbean Games medalists in basketball
Puerto Rican expatriate basketball people in Israel